Veselka is a surname.  means a 'wedding',  means a 'rainbow'. Notable people with the surname include:

Chris Veselka (born 1970), American soccer player
Stefan Veselka (born 1968), Norwegian classical pianist and conductor
Vanessa Veselka (born 1969), American writer